The River is a 2001 Finnish film directed by Jarmo Lampela. It was Finland's submission to the 74th Academy Awards for the Academy Award for Best Foreign Language Film, but was not accepted as a nominee.

See also

Cinema of Finland
List of submissions to the 74th Academy Awards for Best Foreign Language Film

References

External links

2001 films
Finnish romantic drama films
2001 romantic drama films
2000s Finnish-language films